Taushiro, also known as Pinche or Pinchi, is a nearly extinct possible language isolate of the Peruvian Amazon near Ecuador. In 2000 SIL counted one speaker in an ethnic population of 20. Documentation was done in the mid-1970s by Neftalí Alicea. The last living speaker of Taushiro, Amadeo García García, was profiled in The New York Times in 2017.

The first glossary of Taushiro contained 200 words and was collected by Daniel Velie in 1971.

Classification
Following Tovar (1961), Loukotka (1968), and Tovar (1984), Kaufman (1994) notes that while Taushiro has been linked to the Zaparoan languages, it shares greater lexical correspondences with Kandoshi and especially with Omurano. In 2007 he classified Taushiro and Omurano (but not Kandoshi) as Saparo–Yawan languages.

Jolkesky (2016) also notes that there are lexical similarities with Tequiraca and Leco.

Grammar
Word order in Taushiro is Verb–subject–object.

Amadeo García García
In June 2015, the sole remaining native speaker, Amadeo García García was residing in "Intuto on the Tigre River in the northeastern Peruvian region of Loreto." Zachary O’Hagan did targeted field work with him on topics such as ethnohistory, genealogy, sociocultural practices, lexicon, and grammar.

As of December 2017 government linguists from Peru’s Ministry of Culture, working with Amadeo, have created a database of 1,500 Taushiro words, 27 stories, and three songs.

Further reading
Alicea Ortiz, N. (1975). Vocabulario taushiro (Datos Etno-Lingüísticos, 22). Lima: Summer Institute of Linguistics.

References

Languages of Peru
Language isolates of South America
Critically endangered languages
Endangered language isolates